Gilles Madelenat (born 18 February 1967) is a French former water polo player. He competed in the men's tournament at the 1992 Summer Olympics.

References

External links
 

1967 births
Living people
French male water polo players
Olympic water polo players of France
Water polo players at the 1992 Summer Olympics
People from Coutances
Sportspeople from Manche